Maria Höfl-Riesch (née Riesch, born 24 November 1984) is a former German World Cup alpine ski racer. She is a three-time Olympic champion, two-time world champion,  and an overall World Cup champion.

Höfl-Riesch made her World Cup debut in February 2001 and won gold medals in slalom and super combined at the 2010 Winter Olympics. She won the World Cup overall title in 2011. At the 2014 Winter Olympics, she defended her super combined title to win her third Olympic gold medal, and also won a silver medal in the super-G.

Career
Born in Garmisch-Partenkirchen, Höfl-Riesch was a prodigious talent as a junior and won seven medals in all of the disciplines at four Junior World Championships, including three gold medals in combined and super-G.

As the racing careers of Martina Ertl-Renz and Hilde Gerg concluded, Höfl-Riesch rose as the leading female racer on the German national team. Injuries cut short her seasons in 2005 and 2006, causing her to miss the 2005 World Championships and the 2006 Winter Olympics.

During the 2009 season, Höfl-Riesch won four slalom events on the World Cup tour and won the gold medal in the slalom at the World Championships. Prior to 2009, her most successful season was in 2004, when she finished third in the overall World Cup standings, with three race victories. She also finished third in the overall standings in 2008. In the 2007 season she won her second downhill race, at Lake Louise, Canada.

Riesch won two gold medals at the 2010 Winter Olympics, in the super combined and slalom. After finishing second in the overall World Cup standings in 2009 and 2010, Riesch built a big lead early in the 2011 season which was enough to win the overall title, besting three-time defending champion Lindsey Vonn of the U.S. by just three points. At the World Cup finals in Lenzerheide, Vonn took the overall lead after the downhill, then Riesch reclaimed it after the slalom; the super-G and giant slalom races were cancelled due to poor conditions. She retired after the 2014 season after crashing in the downhill World Cup Final.

Personal
Höfl-Riesch is also a nationally ranked tennis player and a cyclist. Her younger sister, Susanne Riesch, is also a former World Cup ski racer, specializing in the slalom. Her uncle, Wolfgang Zimmerer was a bobsledder during the 1960s and 1970s and competed for West Germany in the Winter Olympics, winning gold with Peter Utzschneider at the Two-man bobsleigh during the 1972 Winter Olympics. She has been a chief constable in the Bundeszollverwaltung (German Federal Customs Service) during her sports career.

One of her closest friends (and major rival) on the World Cup tour was Lindsey Vonn of the United States.

Höfl-Riesch married her manager Marcus Höfl on 14 April 2011.

World Cup results

Season titles
 6 titles – (1 overall, 1 downhill, 1 super-G, 2 slalom, 1 combined)

Season standings

Source:

Race victories
 27 wins – (11 DH, 3 SG, 9 SL, 4 SC) + 1 NTE

World Championship results

Olympic results

See also
List of FIS Alpine Ski World Cup women's race winners

References

External links
 
 
 Photo report: Celebrating Maria Riesch
 

1984 births
German female alpine skiers
Alpine skiers at the 2010 Winter Olympics
Alpine skiers at the 2014 Winter Olympics
Olympic alpine skiers of Germany
Medalists at the 2010 Winter Olympics
Medalists at the 2014 Winter Olympics
Olympic medalists in alpine skiing
Olympic gold medalists for Germany
Olympic silver medalists for Germany
FIS Alpine Ski World Cup champions
Sportspeople from Garmisch-Partenkirchen
Living people